The Bermuda national football team represents Bermuda in international football, and is controlled by the Bermuda Football Association, which is a member of the CONCACAF.

History

1964–1992
Bermuda played their first international match on 10 August 1964, against Iceland in Reykjavik, ending in a narrow victory to the Icelanders, 4–3. Some years later, Bermuda played in the 1967 Pan American Games, reaching the final, before being defeated by Mexico, 4–0. In 1968 they participated in the qualifiers for the 1970 FIFA World Cup for the first time. In Group 1 of the first round, they were paired with United States and Canada. They finished the group with one draw (against Canada, 0–0) and three losses and were eliminated. The sixties would end with an elimination at the hands of Mexico, in the 1969 CONCACAF Championship qualification preliminary round, although Bermuda, after having lost 3–0 in Mexico City, managed to defeat the Aztecs 2–1 in Hamilton, on 2 November 1969, with goals from Albert Dowling and Bernard Brangman.

The '70s would begin with another elimination in the first round of the 1971 CONCACAF Championship qualification, again at the hands of Mexico, which prevailed comfortably with an overall result of 6–0. In this decade the Bermuda team managed to win two consecutive bronze medals in the Central American and Caribbean Games of 1974 and 1978. The decade of the '80s was not very significant for the Gombey Warriors since they only participated in the 1982 Central American and Caribbean Games, a tournament where reached 4th place. This would be their final participation in the Games.

On the other hand, between 1967 and 1987, the Bermuda team played several qualifying matches for the Olympic soccer tournament but never qualified for the final tournament. In this period they experienced some of their worst defeats, such as two 8–0 results against Canada and Mexico.

1992–2013
Absent from the World Cup qualifiers between 1972 and 1992, Bermuda returned to the 1994 preliminary tournament where they eliminated Haiti in the first round thanks to the away goals rule, after winning 1–0 in Hamilton (goal by Shaun Goater) and lost 2–1 in Port-au-Prince. Bermuda advanced to the second phase, in group B with Jamaica, Canada and El Salvador, finishing in last place with 4 points, despite managing a historic 1–0 victory against the Selecta, the result of a goal from Kyle Lightbourne. In the 1998 World Cup qualifiers, Bermuda withdrew without playing Trinidad and Tobago in the first round.

The Gombey Warriors would return four years later for the 2002 World Cup qualifiers where they eliminated the British Virgin Islands in the first round, 5–1 and 9–0, before falling in the next phase, at the hands of Antigua and Barbuda, who won thanks to the away goal rule after drawing 0–0 at Saint John's and 1–1 in Hamilton. In the tournament preliminary route to the 2006 FIFA World Cup, Bermuda got their biggest win, thrashing Montserrat 13–0. Later it was eliminated by El Salvador who prevailed 2–1 in San Salvador and later drew 2–2 in Hamilton. In the qualifying process for the 2010 FIFA World Cup, Bermuda eliminated the Cayman Islands in the first round with an aggregate score of 4–1. But it was brought down in the next round by Trinidad and Tobago with an aggregate score of 3–2 although Bermuda achieved an away victory, in Macoya, against the Soca Warriors (1–2), with a double from John Nusum. In the 2014 World Cup qualifiers, Bermuda entered the second round directly in group B, alongside Guyana, Trinidad and Tobago and Barbados. Although they again defeated Trinidad and Tobago (2–1), they could only finish third in the group with 10 points, failing to advance to the third round.

On the other hand, since 1997, Bermuda began to play regularly in the knockout phase of the Caribbean Cup (except in 2001 and 2010) although it never managed to qualify for the final round. Their best performance occurred in the 2007 tournament where they advanced to the second knockout round.

In July 2013, Bermuda claimed the 15th gold medal at the 2013 Island Games, held in Hamilton. This competition is not officially recognised because teams not recognized by FIFA participate.

2015–present 
In 2015 Bermuda participated in the 2018 World Cup Qualifiers where they would face the Bahamas, whom they defeated over the two matches by 5–0. Going into the second round, they faced Guatemala, drawing 0-0 then falling 1–0, failing to reach the third round. Bermuda would return to the Caribbean Cup after being absent in 2014, losing initially against Cuba 2-1 but defeating French Guiana 2–1 to edge through to the second round on goal-difference. They then lost to both Dominican Republic (2-1) and French Guiana (3-0) and were eliminated from the cup.

In 2019, Bermuda debuted in the CONCACAF Nations League where Bermuda made history by qualifying into League A of the competition and, consequently, a chance to qualify for their first CONCACAF Gold Cup. In League A, Bermuda were drawn with Mexico and Panama but finished at the bottom of the group on goal-difference, forcing them into a qualification round for the Gold Cup. They defeated Barbados 8–1 in the first round but, in the final qualifying round, lost to Haiti 4–1 and were eliminated.

Recent fixtures and results
The following is a list of match results in the last 12 months, as well as any future matches that have been scheduled.

2022

2023

Coaching history

  Graham Adams
  Rudi Gutendorf (1968)
  Roderick "Roddy" Burchall
  Gary Darrell (19??–1992)
  Burkhard Ziese (1994–1997)
  Clyde Best (1997–1999)
  Robert Calderon
  Kenny Thompson (2003–2008)
  Devarr Boyles (2011–2012)
  Andrew Bascome (2012–2016)
  Dennis Brown (2013–2016)
  Kyle Lightbourne (2017)
  Devarr Boyles (2017)
 Andrew Bascome  (2017–2018)
 Dennis Brown (2017–2018)
 Kyle Lightbourne (2018–present)

Players

Current squad
 The following 30 players were called up for the 2022–23 CONCACAF Nations League matches.
 Match dates: 25 and 28 March 2023
 Opposition:  and Caps and goals correct as of: 11 June 2022, after the match against 

Recent call-ups
The following players have been called up within the last 12 months.
 

Player records

Players in bold are still active with Bermuda.

Competitive record
World Cup record

CONCACAF Championship/Gold Cup record

CONCACAF Nations League

CFU Caribbean Cup

Island Games record

*Draws include knockout matches decided on penalty kicks.

Honours
 Island Games Champions (1): 2013 Football at 1967 Pan American Games'''  (1) 1967

References

External links
Bermuda Football Association
Bermuda Football Association at FIFA.com

 
Caribbean national association football teams